Dugu Xin (Chinese: 獨孤信; 503 – 24 April 557), Xianbei name Qimitou (期彌頭), known as Dugu Ruyuan (獨孤如願) before 540, was a prominent general and official during the chaotic Northern and Southern dynasties period of imperial China. In 534, Dugu Xin followed Emperor Xiaowu of Northern Wei to the west to join the warlord Yuwen Tai, and in the ensuing years led Western Wei forces against their nemesis, the Eastern Wei. Despite an early debacle (after which he fled to and stayed for 3 years in the southern Liang dynasty before returning to the northwest), he captured the former Northern Wei capital Luoyang from Eastern Wei in 537. He rose to high ranks under Yuwen Tai, and his eldest daughter married Yuwen Tai's son Yuwen Yu. When the Northern Zhou dynasty replaced Western Wei, Dugu Xin was created Duke of Wei (衛國公), but was soon forced to commit suicide by the powerful regent Yuwen Hu.

Dugu Xin was described as an extremely handsome man and was fond of wearing strange clothes. He is best remembered today due to his three daughters: it is because of their marriages that he was a father-in-law to two emperors from two Chinese dynasties (Emperor Ming of Northern Zhou and Emperor Wen of Sui), and maternal grandfather to two emperors from two dynasties (Emperor Yang of Sui and Emperor Gaozu of Tang), all after his death. In fact, every Chinese emperor for 3 centuries (from 604 to 907, with the exception of Wu Zetian and self-proclaimed rebels) was descended from him. During the Sui dynasty, Dugu Xin was honored as Duke Jing of Zhao (趙景公) by Emperor Wen (who married his seventh daughter Dugu Qieluo). In 583, the empress built a temple dedicated to his memory in the capital Daxingcheng, the remains of which were discovered in 1997 on the campus of Xi'an Jiaotong University.

Family 
Parents
Father: Dugu Kuzhe (獨孤庫者), Duke Gong of Si (司空公)
Mother: Lady of the Changle County, of the Feilian clan (长乐郡君  費連氏)
Consorts and their respective issue(s):
Lady Luo, of the Luo clan (罗氏)
 Dugu Luo (獨孤羅, 534 – 599), Duke of Shu (蜀恭公), first son
Lady Guo, of the Guo clan (郭氏)
Dugu Shan (獨孤善, 530– 570), Duke Jun of Henei (河内郡公), second son
Dugu Mu (獨孤穆), Duke Xiao of Jinquan (金泉县公), third son
Empress Mingjing (明敬皇后, 536 – 558), first daughter
Married Yuwen Yu, Emperor Ming of Northern Zhou and had issue (one son)
Dugu Zang (獨孤藏, 544 – 20 September 578), Duke Xian of Wuping (武平县公), fourth son
Dugu Shun (獨孤順), Duke Cheng of Wu (武成公), fifth son
Dugu Tuo (獨孤陀), Duke Xian of Wuxi (武喜县公), sixth son
Dugu Zheng (獨孤整), eighth son
Lady Cui, of the Cui clan of Qinghe (清河崔氏)
Dugu Qieluo, Empress Wenxian (文獻皇后, 544 – 10 September 602), seventh daughter
Married Yang Jian, Emperor Wen of Sui and had issue (five sons and five daughters) 
Unknown 
Dugu Zong (獨孤宗), seventh son
Lady Dugu (獨孤氏), second daughter
Lady Dugu (獨孤氏), third daughter
Empress Yuanzhen (元贞皇后), fourth daughter
Married Li Bing, Duke of Tang and had issue (one son and one daughter)
Lady Dugu (獨孤氏), fifth daughter
Lady Dugu (獨孤氏), sixth daughter

Notes and references

503 births
557 deaths
Western Wei
Northern Zhou generals
Forced suicides of Chinese people
Chinese duellists
Suicides in Northern Zhou